Marcus Lataives Webb (born May 9, 1970) is an American retired professional basketball player who played briefly in the National Basketball Association (NBA).

High school
Born and raised in Montgomery, Alabama, Webb played at basketball at Sidney Lanier High School.

College career
Webb played college basketball at the University of Alabama, with the Alabama Crimson Tide.

Professional career
Webb was selected with the 28th overall selection, of the 1992 Continental Basketball Association (CBA) Draft. He played in nine games with the NBA's Boston Celtics, during the 1992–93 season, averaging 4.3 points and 1.1 rebounds per game.

He last played professionally in Argentina in 2005.

References

External links
NBA stats @ basketballreference.com

1970 births
Living people
21st-century African-American sportspeople
African-American basketball players
Alabama Crimson Tide men's basketball players
American expatriate basketball people in Argentina
American expatriate basketball people in Cyprus
American expatriate basketball people in France
American expatriate basketball people in Russia
American expatriate basketball people in Turkey
American men's basketball players
APOEL B.C. players
Basketball players from Montgomery, Alabama
Beşiktaş men's basketball players
Boston Celtics players
Chicago Rockers players
Élan Béarnais players
Karşıyaka basketball players
Obras Sanitarias basketball players
PBC CSKA Moscow players
Piratas de Quebradillas players
Power forwards (basketball)
Tofaş S.K. players
Undrafted National Basketball Association players
20th-century African-American sportspeople